Qarmas (also spelled Qurmus) is a village in northern Syria, administratively part of the Hama Governorate, located west of Hama. Nearby localities include Aqrab to the north, Tell Dahab to the east, Kafr Laha to the southeast, al-Taybah al-Gharbiyah to the south, Maryamin to the southwest, Awj and Kafr Kamrah to the west and Baarin to the northwest. According to the Syria Central Bureau of Statistics, Mahrusah had a population of 5,331 in the 2004 census. Its inhabitants are predominantly Alawites.

References

Bibliography

Populated places in Masyaf District
Alawite communities in Syria